
The following is a list of Playboy Playmates of 1990.  Playboy magazine names its Playmate of the Month each month throughout the year.

January

Peggy McIntaggart (also known as Peggy Sands and Peggy Sanders) (born September 6, 1961, Penetanguishene, Ontario) is a Canadian model, actress, photographer and stylist who was Playboy's Playmate of the Month for January 1990.

McIntaggart grew up in Ontario, Canada. In 1980, when she was twenty, she entered the Miss Nude World contest in Stoney Creek, Ontario, on a dare and ended up winning. As a result, she decided to pursue a career in modeling. After appearing in Playboy, McIntaggart began acting. She appeared in Baywatch, Beverly Hills Cop II and Camp Fear. McIntaggart also worked as Hugh Hefner's make-up artist and hair stylist. She dated Bob Seagren. The relationship ended in 2007. Today, McIntaggart works as a stylist and photographer.

February

Pamela Denise Anderson (born July 1, 1967) is a Canadian actress. She is a famous glamour model, actress, producer, author, activist, and former showgirl, known for her roles on the television series Home Improvement, Baywatch, and V.I.P.

She was chosen as a Playmate of the Month for Playboy magazine in February 1990.  For a time, she was known as Pamela Anderson Lee (or Pamela Lee) after marrying Mötley Crüe drummer Tommy Lee. She holds both United States and Canadian citizenship.

Anderson's Playboy career spans approximately three decades (1989–2016), and she has appeared on more Playboy covers than anyone else (fourteen). She has also made appearances in the publication's newsstand specials.

March

Deborah Driggs (born December 13, 1963, in Oakland, California) is an American model and actress. She was chosen as Playboy's Playmate of the Month for March 1990. She also appeared on the cover of the magazine for its April 1990 issue. She was married to the Olympic gymnast Mitch Gaylord from June 28, 1992, through January 1, 2003 and they have three children. She is the coauthor, along with Karen Risch, of the book Hot Pink: The Girls' Guide to Primping, Passion, and Pubic Fashion. She also appeared in one of the videos for the Devo single "Post Post-Modern Man".

April

Lisa Matthews (born Lisa Reich on September 24, 1969, in Peoria, Illinois) is an American model and actress. She was chosen as Playboy's Playmate of the Month for April 1990, and was later named 1991's Playmate of the Year. She received over $100,000 for her winnings. That year, Matthews appeared in the Bruce Willis film Hudson Hawk. She dated the movie's producer, Joel Silver. In 2017 at the age of 48 Matthews duplicated her Playmate of the Year cover along with her cohorts Kimberly Conrad, Renee Tenison, Candace Collins, Cathy St. George, Kemp Muhl, and Monique St. Pierre nearly three decades on.

May

Tina Bockrath (born 30 June 1967 in Dayton, Ohio) is an American model and actress. She was chosen as Playboy's Playmate of the Month for May 1990 and has appeared in numerous Playboy videos.  Bockrath was the final Playmate of the Month photographed by Pompeo Posar.

June

Bonnie Marino (born December 20, 1961, in Cleveland, Ohio) is an American model and actress. She was chosen as the Playboy magazine's Playmate of the Month for June 1990.

July

Jacqueline Sheen (born March 3, 1963, in Dallas) is an American model and actress. She was chosen as Playboy's Playmate of the Month for July 1990 and has appeared in numerous Playboy videos.

August

Melissa Evridge (born November 2, 1968, in Lexington, Kentucky) is an American model and actress. She was chosen as Playboy's Playmate of the Month for August 1990 and has appeared in numerous Playboy videos. She also appeared on the cover of the October 1990 issue of the magazine.

September

Kerri Kendall (born September 25, 1970) is a Californian model and actress. She was chosen as Playboys Playmate of the Month in September 1990 and has appeared in numerous Playboy videos. She also appeared as a model for Perfect 10.

October

Alison Armitage (born 26 February 1965 in London, England) is a British actress. Under the pseudonym Brittany York, she was Playboys Playmate of the Month for October 1990.

Armitage had a leading role in the television series Acapulco H.E.A.T. from 1993 to 1994 and from 1996 to 1997. She has also had bit parts in movies such as Jerry Maguire and Driven. She also appeared in a pictorial in Maxim magazine in 1999.

November

Lorraine Olivia (born February 20, 1968, in Geneva, Illinois) is an American model and actress. She was chosen as Playboys Playmate of the Month for November 1990. She had a bit part in the 1993 film Coneheads, playing an attractive dancer on Remulac.

December

Morgan Fox (born 28 May 1970 in Prince George, British Columbia) is a Canadian model and actress.

In 1988 she became Miss World Canada.  In 1990, she played the role of "Robunda Hooters" in the film Flesh Gordon Meets the Cosmic Cheerleaders. She was chosen as Playboy's Playmate of the Month for December 1990 and has appeared in Playboy videos.

See also
 List of people in Playboy 1990–1999

References

1990-related lists
1990
Playmates Of 1990